Craig Oliver may refer to:
Craig Oliver (British journalist), former BBC executive and communications director in David Cameron's government
Craig Oliver (Canadian journalist), reporter for Canada's CTV television network